The SS City of Erie was a sidewheeler steamboat on Lake Erie. It was famous for being one of the fastest ships on the Great Lakes, at the time. It also won a race against a newer, rival ship.

Construction 
The City of Erie was built in 1898 by the Detroit Dry Dock Company in Wyandotte, Michigan, for the Cleveland Buffalo Transit Company (C&B). It was designed by Frank E. Kirby. The ship was launched on February 26, 1898, and made its maiden voyage on June 19, 1898.

Operations 
The City of Erie'''s route was from Cleveland, Ohio, and Erie, Pennsylvania, to Buffalo, New York. It was nicknamed the "Honeymoon Special" from the number of newlyweds who travelled to Buffalo, bound for Niagara Falls, on the City of Erie. Starting in 1929, the City of Erie operated between Cleveland and Port Stanley, Ontario.

 Steamboat race 
After a friendly race between the City of Chicago and the City of Milwaukee in September 1900, a Chicago newspaper boasted the winner (the City of Chicago) was the "fastest on the lakes". A paper in Detroit, Michigan, subsequently listed nine other vessels (including the City of Erie) that could have easily beat the City of Chicago. The list failed to mention the newest ship built for Detroit's White Star Line, the Tashmoo. The Tashmoo, also designed by Kirby, was built in 1900 and was built specifically for speed. The president of Detroit's White Star Line offered $1,000 to any ship that could beat the Tashmoo in a race. J. W. Wescott, president of the C&B, accepted the challenge.

The City of Erie was initially ahead but was soon overtaken by the Tashmoo. The Tashmoo eventually slowed and was passed as soon as it was out of sight of the shore because the "wheelman [of the Tashmoo] was not used to steering [only] by compass." The Tashmoo was later forced to slow again due to an overheating condenser. The City of Erie beat the Tashmoo by 45 seconds, with the Tashmoo still gaining ground. The owners of the City of Erie refused to have a rematch, although it was admitted that the Tashmoo was the faster ship.

 End of service 
On September 27, 1909, the City of Erie collided with the schooner, T. Vance Straubenstein.  The schooner was sunk, drowning three people.

The City of Erie'' was retired from service in 1938 and was scrapped in Cleveland in 1941.

References 

1898 ships
Great Lakes ships
History of Cleveland
Ships built in Wyandotte, Michigan
Paddle steamers of the United States
History of Erie, Pennsylvania
Passenger ships of the United States